The Streeton Trio is an Australian classical piano trio comprising violinist Emma Jardine, pianist Benjamin Kopp and cellist Umberto Clerici.

The trio was founded in 2008 in Geneva, Switzerland by Benjamin Kopp, Emma Jardine, and cellist Martin Smith, and named after the Australian painter Sir Arthur Streeton.

Kopp was a winner of the ABC Symphony Australia Young Performers Awards in the Keyboard Category; Jardine has performed with the Orchestre de la Suisse Romande; and Clerici is Principal Cellist with the Sydney Symphony Orchestra

The Streeton Trio won the 2011 Musica Viva Chamber Music Competition.

From 2010-2013 the trio studied at the European Chamber Music Academy.

Formerly based in Switzerland and then Germany, the trio is now based in Sydney, Australia and performs internationally.  They have made three recordings, including a CD of the music of Elena Kats-Chernin, another with works by Joseph Haydn, Ludwig van Beethoven and Roger Smalley, and another with trios by Ravel and Brahms.

Sources
 "The Streetons revel in Kats-Chernin's Viennese, Russian, Gypsy fusions", Limelight, December 2013, p. 77

References

Chamber music groups
Piano trios
Musical groups established in 2008
Australian classical music groups
Australian musical trios